Miguel Câmara Machado (born 29 June 1999) is a Portuguese footballer who plays for CD Operário as a midfielder.

References

External links

Stats and profile at LPFP 
Miguel Machado at ZeroZero

1999 births
Living people
Portuguese footballers
Association football midfielders
Liga Portugal 2 players
C.D. Santa Clara players
Sport Benfica e Castelo Branco players